The Charles V. Keating Centre (also known as the KMC) is a multi-purpose arena and conference centre located on the campus of St. Francis Xavier University in Antigonish, Nova Scotia, Canada. The $20 million athletics and conference centre was built in 2001 as part of St. Francis Xavier's campus renewal program and is named after Canadian businessman Charles Keating. The building houses two large ice surfaces and the main surface can be converted into a large open area mainly for concerts and graduation. The main stadium seats 1,501. The entire building's area can hold over 2,207 people with room to spare. The KMC is home to the St. Francis Xavier X-Men and X-Women hockey teams of the AUS conference of Canadian Interuniversity Sport. The 2006 CIS Women's Ice Hockey Championships were held at the KMC.

External links
 Official website

Indoor arenas in Nova Scotia
Indoor ice hockey venues in Canada
Sports venues in Nova Scotia
Music venues in Nova Scotia
Buildings and structures in Antigonish County, Nova Scotia
Tourist attractions in Antigonish County, Nova Scotia
St. Francis Xavier University